Iago Kiladze is a Georgian (until 2006) and Ukrainian (since 2007) professional boxer fighting in the cruiserweight division. He fights out of Kyiv, Ukraine. He is a former World Boxing Association Inter-Continental cruiserweight title-holder.

Professional boxing record

1986 births
Living people
Sportspeople from Tbilisi
Cruiserweight boxers
Heavyweight boxers
Ukrainian male boxers
Male boxers from Georgia (country)
Georgian emigrants to Ukraine
Naturalized citizens of Ukraine

References